The Headies 2018 was the 12th edition of The Headies. It was held on May 5, 2018, at the Eko Convention Centre in Victoria Island, Lagos. Nigerian comedian Bovi and singer Seyi Shay hosted the ceremony. After shortlisting thousands of entries submitted during the eligibility period, the organizers of the ceremony announced the nominees in April 2018. They also announced the addition of  three categories: Viewer's Choice, Best Performer, and Industry Brand Supporter. Simi led the nominations with 7, followed by Wizkid and Davido with 6 each. The ceremony featured performances from a number of artists, including Falz, Mr Real, Simi, and the Danfo Drivers. Pulse Nigeria praised the award's sound production and stage design. Davido, Wizkid and Simi won the most awards with 3 each. Mayorkun won the Next Rated award, beating Dice Ailes, Maleek Berry and Johnny Drille.

Performances
Falz
Simi
Zule Zoo
Danfo Drivers
Mr Real
Niniola

Winners and nominees

Notes

References

2018 music awards
The Headies